Poena is Koning (lit. Poena is King) is a South African Afrikaans-language sex comedy film released on 21 September 2007. It was directed by Willie Esterhuizen.

Plot
The film follows the sexual awakening of Poena Pieterse (Robbie Wessels) and his best friend, Vaatjie (Gerhard Odendaal), both of whom are determined to lose their virginity before finishing school.

Release and reception 
Poena is Koning was released in South Africa on 21 September 2007, in both Afrikaans and English-subtitled versions. Between its first and second weekend of release, the film's attendance increased by 5.7% and box office earnings per site increased by 12%. By August 2008, the film had grossed R2,446,025. In a 2008 interview, Esterhuizen described Poena is Koning as "a humorous ethnic minority film that appealed to the movie-going ethnic minority it was meant for."

The South African news website Independent Online awarded the film one star and described it as "what seems to be an attempt to make an Afrikaans American Pie". The film is considered one of the most representative films in Esterhuizen's body of work, having been "elevated to public property in Afrikaans circles that devour his film contributions with gusto, due to its crude and hearty humour." According to academic Chris Broodryk, Poena is Koning draws on American influences such as Porky’s (1981) and Fast Times at Ridgemont High (1982) but nevertheless follows a common theme in the director's body of work, by equating the quest for sexual intercourse with post-apartheid white masculinity.

Spinoffs and sequels 
The film's financial success led to a 2008 spin-off Vaatjie Sien sy Gat, in which Gerhard Odendaal reprised his role as Vaatjie. Wessels reprised his role as Poena Pieterse in two television films, Poena (2020) and Poena en Poenie (2021). A television series, Poena, first aired on kykNET on 4 April 2022.

Cast 
 Robbie Wessels as Poena Pieterse
 Gerhard Odendaal as Vaatjie
 Perlé van Schalkwyk
 Lizz Meiring
 Wim Botes
 Llandie Grobler
 Carien Botha as Blapsie
 Ben Kruger as the headmaster

See also 
 List of Afrikaans-language films

References

External links 
 Poena is koning at moviesite.co.za

Afrikaans-language films
Sex comedy films
South African comedy films
2007 films
2007 comedy films